When Then Is Now is actress Lisa Chappell's first CD. It was released on 1 May 2006.

She got her inspiration for the songs on the set of the series McLeod's Daughters. Chappell said, "I was very influenced by the landscape we worked in just outside of (sic) Adelaide. The environment was so harsh. In the summer it could get up to 50 degrees outside and the winters were very cold. I was out in the elements all day but I couldn't wait to get home and practice my guitar and write songs." She was influenced in her writing by artists like Bob Dylan and Neil Young and two albums in particular: Damien Rice's O and Lucinda Williams' Essence.

Track listing
Flowers In The Wasteland
Love's Around The Corner
Desire
Mother Son
Noah
Pheromone City
When Then Is Now
Auckland Airport (intro to Dancing Hands)
Dancing Hands
Midnight Bird
Lullaby

References

External links
 Chappell's music site, with lyrics from her new CD

2006 albums